Silesian Beskids (Polish: , Czech:) is one of the Beskids mountain ranges in Outer Western Carpathians in southern Silesian Voivodeship, Poland and the eastern Moravian-Silesian Region, Czech Republic. 

Most of the range lies in Poland. It is separated from the Moravian-Silesian Beskids by the Jablunkov Pass.

The Polish part of the range includes the protected area called Silesian Beskids Landscape Park.

The highest mountains 
Silesian Beskids have 20 mountains with a highest point above 1000 m, including three above 1200 m and nine above 1100 m.
 Skrzyczne (1,257 m) - the highest mountain
 Barania Góra (1,220 m) - the highest mountain of the Polish part of Upper Silesia
 Małe Skrzyczne (1,211 m)
 Wierch Wisełka (1,192 m)
 Równiański Wierch (1,160 m)
 Zielony Kopiec (1,152 m)
 Malinowska Skała (1,152 m)
 Magurka Wiślańska (1,140 m)
 Klimczok (1,117 m)
 Malinów (1,115 m)
 Magura  (1,109 m)
 Magurka Radziechowska (1,108 m)
 Trzy Kopce (1,082 m)
 Stołów (1,035 m)
 Glinne (1,034 m)
 Przysłop (1,029 m)
 Szyndzielnia (1,028 m)
 Muronka (1,021 m)
 Jaworzyna (1,020 m)
 Kościelec (1,019 m)
 Czantoria Wielka (995 m) - the highest mountain of the Czech part of the range
 Kiczory (990 m)
 Stożek Wielki (978 m)

See also 
 Cieszyn Silesia
 Polish minority in the Czech Republic
Gorals

References

External links 
  Regional Tourist Service

 
Cieszyn Silesia
Mountain ranges of the Czech Republic
Mountain ranges of Poland